Christian Ogochukwu Ibeagha (born January 10, 1990) is a Nigerian-born American soccer player.

Career

Youth, College and Amateur
Ibeagha attended Deer Creek High School in Edmond, Oklahoma and spent his entire college career at Duke University. Prior to Duke, he was a Two-time NSCAA Youth All-America selection and a member of the U.S. soccer residency program in 2006 and 2007.

In his freshman year, Ibeagha was named to the All-ACC Freshman team after making 16 appearances for Duke in 2007. In 2008, he made 20 appearances and recorded an assist. He was also ranked fourth in the team in minutes played with 1,513. In his junior year, Ibeagha was named to the NSCAA All-South Region third team after making 20 appearances and finishing with a goal and an assist. In his senior season, Ibeagha started the first five games of the season before suffering a season-ending injury.

During his time in College, Ibeagha also played in the USL Premier Development League, spending the 2008 season with Bradenton Academics and the 2009 season with Cary Clarets.  He also spent two seasons with Carolina Dynamo after failing to sign with a professional club.

Professional
On July 26, 2012, Ibeagha signed his first professional contract, joining NASL club Puerto Rico Islanders.  About a week later, Ibeagha made his professional debut in a 2-1 victory over San Antonio Scorpions FC.

Ibeagha signed with Bohemians 1905 in the Czech Republic in October 2013.

In February 2015 he signed with the Faroese club FC Suðuroy on loan. After his release from Bohemians, Ibeagha joined United Soccer League side Colorado Springs Switchbacks.

On March 3, 2017, Ibeagha signed with NASL side North Carolina FC.

On January 15, 2018, Ibeagha signed with USL side Oklahoma City Energy.

Personal
Christian's brother, Sebastien Ibeagha, currently plays for Los Angeles FC.

References

External links
Duke University bio

1990 births
Living people
Nigerian footballers
American soccer players
American expatriate soccer players
Duke Blue Devils men's soccer players
IMG Academy Bradenton players
Cary Clarets players
North Carolina Fusion U23 players
Puerto Rico Islanders players
FC Suðuroy players
Colorado Springs Switchbacks FC players
North Carolina FC players
OKC Energy FC players
Expatriate footballers in Puerto Rico
USL League Two players
North American Soccer League players
United States men's youth international soccer players
Sportspeople from Port Harcourt
Soccer players from Texas
Association football defenders
Nigerian emigrants to the United States
USL Championship players